Yamaguchi opening rule is a renju opening rule. It was developed by Japanese player Yusui Yamaguchi.

Rule details 
The sequence of moves implied by the rule follows.
 The first player (tentative black) puts one of the 26 openings and declares how many 5th moves will be offered in that game.
 The next player (tentative white) has a right to swap.
 The white player puts the 4th move anywhere on the board.
 The black player puts as many 5th moves on the board as it was declared before (symmetrical moves not allowed).
 The white player chooses one 5th from these offerings and plays the 6th move.

Brief description 
This rule is very close to an old RIF opening rule and therefore favorited. It gives an average variety of new playable variants in a good number of openings, but some of them (13ths and some others) don't become playable. More, this opening rule doesn't protect players from a 11D-draw variants.

Tournaments played by this rule 

This opening rule was official opening rule for Renju World Championships and Renju Team World Championships from 2009 to 2015.

External links 
 http://renju.net/media/showrule.php?rule=5 Renju International Federation - description of Yamaguchi rule.
 http://renju.net/organizations/ga2008.php - RIF GA with rule description
 http://www.renjusha.net/8twc_info.html - Team World Championship-2010 organizer's site, Yamaguchi rule mentioned as tournament rule.
 http://renju.net/media/tourninfo.php?tournament_id=545 - Information about World Championship-2009 finals.

References 

Renju opening rules